Resuscitative Endovascular Balloon Occlusion of the Aorta (REBOA) is a procedure that involves placement of an endovascular balloon in the aorta to control bleeding, augment afterload and maintain blood pressure temporarily in traumatic hemorrhagic shock. REBOA is considered a minimally-invasive alternative to thoracotomy with aortic cross-clamping (ACC).

Methods
The technique involves inserting a small balloon directly into the patient's aorta and inflating it. The balloon blocks the artery and temporarily stops the blood flow giving doctors time to operate. It maintains blood circulation in the brain and heart. However, the parts of the body below the balloon are cut off from the normal blood flow and this may result in short- or longer-term problems. This technique has been successfully used in operations to control non-compressible torso hemorrhages in adults; but this has not been studied for children.

See also 
 Selective aortic arch perfusion
 Balloon tamponade

References

Bleeding
Medical emergencies
Interventional radiology